Ranks and insignia of Reichsluftschutzbund were paramilitary titles adopted by the  ( – RLB) for wear on the paramilitary uniforms of the RLB.

Table of ranks

References